Nome is a rural locality in the City of Townsville, Queensland, Australia.

Geography
The Bruce Highway forms the southern boundary of the locality. The North Coast railway line enters the locality from the east (Cape Cleveland) and roughly follows Nome's southern boundary before exiting to the west (Julago).

There were a number of railway stations in the locality, all now abandoned (from north to south):
 Nome railway station
 Alligator Creek railway station
 Killymoon railway station

Oolbun is a neighbourhood on the northern boundary in the locality.

The locality has the following mountains:

 Mount Matthew 
 Woodstock Hill 
Nome has an area of 53.1 square kilometers and an average elevation of 39 meters above sea level.

History
The locality's name is derived the from railway station name, which in turn is believed to be a corruption of NQME (North Queensland Meat Export) Siding. 

Of these, 525 were male, and 467 were female.  22.7% of the population was under the age of 15, and 9.7% were 65 or older. The median age was 47, the median personal income was A$635/week, and the median household income was A$1356/week. Most residents were Australian by birth, but Nome also has significant communities from the United Kingdom and New Zealand.

Attractions
Nome is the home of the Billabong Sanctuary, an interactive wildlife sanctuary.

References

City of Townsville
Localities in Queensland